Pimpoint is the fourth studio album by Japanese jazz group Soil & "Pimp" Sessions. It was released on August 21, 2007.

Track listing
All composed by Soil & "Pimp" Sessions, except where noted.
Japanese Edition (59:43)

UK Edition (66:43)

Credits
Performed and arranged by Soil & "Pimp" Sessions
Agitator – Shacho
Saxophone – Motoharu
Trumpet – Tabu Zombie
Piano – Josei
Bass – Akita Goldman
Drums – Midorin
Recorded and mixed by – Shinjiro Ideka
Recorded at Victor Studios, Innig Studios
Mixed at Heartbeat Recording Studios
Assistant Engineers, Yoshiyuki Watanabe (Victor), Kimihiro Nakase (Innig), Naoya Tokunou (Heartbeat Recording)
Mastered by Tasuji Maeda (Bernie Grundman Mastering)
A&R Director, Yuichi Sorita
Original Artwork, Takahi Kawanishi
Original Design, Tetsuya Nagato (www.nagato.com)
Photography, Akira Okimura (D-cord)
Visual Co-ordination, Tomoro Watanabe
European edition design, Robi Bear, wadadameanlove.com
A&R (UK), Gilles Peterson

References

2007 albums
Soil & "Pimp" Sessions albums